Michael Adewale A. Oluwabunmi Bakare (born 1 December 1986) is an English professional footballer who plays as a forward for HIFK.

Career

Early career
Bakare started his senior career in the 2006–07 season, playing for Hertford Town and Waltham Forest. The following season, Bakare signed for Welwyn Garden City. In 2008, Bakare signed for Leyton, before spells with Welling United, and Thurrock. In 2010, Bakare joined Bishop's Stortford. It was here where he first made a real impact, converting from a full back and midfielder to a forward player.

Following an impressive 9 goals in 14 games early in the 2011/12 season, Bakare joined Conference South club Chelmsford City, in a free transfer on 19 October 2011. He continued to impress at his new club, scoring 5 goals in 10 games, which earned Bakare a move to Football League side, Macclesfield Town on 17 January 2012.

Macclesfield Town
Bakare signed on a free transfer, and made his first appearance as a substitute against Swindon Town on 21 January 2012. He was however limited to substitute appearances at Macclesfield, not starting a single game, and was released by the club, following their relegation at the end of the 2011/2012 season, making only 9 appearances. His last game was against Southend United on 5 May 2012.

Southport
Conference National club Southport took Bakare on trial in July 2012. After a single appearance in a friendly against Skelmersdale United it was announced manager Liam Watson had signed the player to a contract for the 2012–13 season at the club's AGM on 27 July 2012.

Droylsden (loan)
In October 2012 he joined Droylsden on loan and scored on his club debut on 27 October as the club beat Colwyn Bay.

2013–2016
From then on he has been somewhat of a journeyman, going on to play for Chelmsford City, Dover Athletic, Tonbridge Angels, Braintree Town, Bury Town, VCD Athletic and Witham Town before rejoining his former club Welling United for the 2015/16 season.

Wrexham
On 22 June 2016, he joined Wrexham, along with his Welling teammate Nortei Nortey, on a 1-year deal. He made his debut for the club on the opening day of the 2016–17 season, in a 0–0 draw with Dover Athletic.

On 24 November 2016, he joined Billericay Town on loan from Wrexham until January 2017. He made his debut in a league match against Metropolitan Police where he won his side a penalty before converting it himself, in a game that finished 1–1. Following the end of his loan spell, Bakare returned to Wrexham where his contract was cancelled by mutual consent on 23 January 2017.

Warrington Town
Bakare signed for Warrington Town on 23 March 2017.

Connah's Quay Nomads
In August 2017, Bakare joined Welsh Premier League side Connah's Quay Nomads, alongside his brother Mathias, after a successful trial period. In May 2018, he scored in the Welsh Cup final, helping his team to a 4–1 win. In December 2018, Bakare extended his contract with Connah's Quay for a further year.

Hereford
On 16 February 2021, Bakare joined National League North side Hereford on a short-term deal.

Iceland
ON 13 July 2021, Bakare signed for Icelandic 1. deild karla side Fjölnir, joining a team outside of the UK for the first time.

Leatherhead
In November 2021, he returned to England and signed for Isthmian League Premier Division side Leatherhead.

Arbroath
In February 2022, Bakare signed a short-term deal with Scottish Championship side Arbroath until the end of the season.

In July 2022, Bakare joined Veikkausliiga side HIFK until the end of the year.

References

External links

1986 births
Living people
Footballers from the London Borough of Hackney
English footballers
Association football midfielders
Hertford Town F.C. players
Waltham Forest F.C. players
Welwyn Garden City F.C. players
Leyton F.C. players
Welling United F.C. players
Thurrock F.C. players
Bishop's Stortford F.C. players
Chelmsford City F.C. players
Macclesfield Town F.C. players
Southport F.C. players
Droylsden F.C. players
Dover Athletic F.C. players
Tonbridge Angels F.C. players
Braintree Town F.C. players
Bury Town F.C. players
VCD Athletic F.C. players
Witham Town F.C. players
Wrexham A.F.C. players
Billericay Town F.C. players
Warrington Town F.C. players
Connah's Quay Nomads F.C. players
Hereford F.C. players
Ungmennafélagið Fjölnir players
Leatherhead F.C. players
Arbroath F.C. players
English Football League players
National League (English football) players
Isthmian League players
English people of Nigerian descent
Black British sportsmen
English expatriate footballers
Expatriate footballers in Iceland
English expatriate sportspeople in Iceland
Expatriate footballers in Finland
English expatriate sportspeople in Finland
Veikkausliiga players
HIFK Fotboll players